Mimosa was a clipper ship best known for carrying the first Welsh emigrants to South America in 1865.

Voyage to Patagonia

By the time Mimosa made the voyage she was already past her prime, having been built in 1853 at Hall's shipyard in Aberdeen.  She had not been designed to carry passengers, but had been converted for the purpose. The cost of fitting provisioning and chartering the ship was £2,500 and the passengers paid £12 per adult or £6 per child for the journey. Before the voyage the emigrants assembled at various points, not always their places of origin, to prepare for the journey, including Aberdare, Birkenhead and Mountain Ash.

Mimosa sailed from Liverpool, England on 28 May 1865 to Patagonia, South America with a group of about 153 passengers with Captain George Pepperell and a crew of 18. Thomas Greene, an Irishman from Kildare, had been appointed as ship's surgeon. They landed on 28 July 1865 and named their landing site Porth Madryn. They were met by Edwyn Cynrig Roberts and Lewis Jones who had already arrived in Patagonia in June 1865 to prepare for the arrival of the main body of settlers. Their aim was to establish a Welsh colony which would preserve the Welsh language and culture. The proposed site for the colony was in the Chubut River valley. On 15 September 1865 the first town in the Chubut colony was named Rawson, and the settlers went on to build the settlements at Gaiman and Trelew.

Welsh emigrants aboard Mimosa

The exact number of emigrants who sailed out to Patagonia on Mimosa remains uncertain. Although one of the original settlers, Richard Jones (Berwyn), maintained a register of births, marriages and deaths for many years, most of these original records were lost in the great flood in the Chubut Valley in 1899. In 1875, the Argentine government granted the Welsh settlers ownership of the land which encouraged hundreds of others from Wales to join the colony.

In the early 21st century, approximately 50,000 Patagonians are of Welsh descent, of whom around 5,000 are Welsh speakers. The Welsh-Argentine colony, which became known as Y Wladfa, remains centered on Gaiman, Trelew and Trevelin.

1865 settlers

See also
Welsh Tract
Welsh colonization of the Americas

References

Bibliography
Susan Wilkinson - Mimosa: the life & times of the ship that sailed to Patagonia (Y Lolfa, 2007)
Susan Wilkinson - Mimosa's Voyages: Official Logs, Crew List and Masters (Y Lolfa, 2007)
Clare Dudman - A Place of Meadows and Tall Trees (Seren, 2010) - Novel based on the voyage and settlement.

External links
 Project-Hiraeth – Documents the stories of the Welsh colony in Patagonia, Argentina through film, text and illustration.
 Photograph of Mimosa passengers in 1890
 Ticket of Rev. Abraham Matthews for journey to Patagonia
 The Wales-Argentina Society website

Welsh emigration
Tea clippers
Individual sailing vessels
Age of Sail merchant ships of England
Victorian-era merchant ships of the United Kingdom
Victorian-era passenger ships of the United Kingdom
Ships built in Aberdeen
Welsh settlement in Patagonia
1853 ships